Mallmann is a German surname. Notable people with the surname include:

Francis Mallmann (born 1956), Argentine chef
Joseph Mallmann (c. 1827 – 1886), German businessman
Klaus-Michael Mallmann (born 1948), German writer
Shirley Mallmann (born 1977), Brazilian model
Wallyson Mallmann (born 1994), Brazilian footballer

German-language surnames